William Charles Gibson was the 13th Accountant General and Controller of Revenue of Ceylon. He was appointed on 1 October 1851, succeeding Charles Justin MacCarthy, and held the office until 1861. He was succeeded by R. T. Pennefather.

References

Auditors General of Sri Lanka
Chief Secretaries of Ceylon